Michael Aronov (born May 4, 1976) is an American actor who has worked in film, television and theatre. In 2017, he won the Tony Award for Best Featured Actor in a Play for his role as Uri Savir in the Broadway play Oslo. He is also known for playing the role of Anton Baklanov, a refusenik scientist in The Americans.

Early life
Aronov was born in Tashkent, Uzbekistan and he is Jewish. He grew up in Miami, Florida and graduated from the city's New World School of the Arts. In 1998 he graduated with a B.F.A in theatre at Meadows School of the Arts at Southern Methodist University.

Career
Aronov spent three seasons on the award-winning series The Americans playing a physicist who is torn from his family and exiled as a political prisoner. In 2017 The Blacklist brought him on as a new member to the show's cast, playing Smokey Putnum, the lovable hustler and sidekick to James Spader. Aronov was also recurring as right-hand-man to John Malkovich in Showtime's Billions. Aronov is currently playing one of the leads in a new series for Cinemax called Jett and was recently seen opposite Ben Kingsley and Oscar Isaac on the big screen in Operation Finale.

In film, Aronov is known for his role as Chovka, the Chechen warlord and head gangster opposite Tom Hardy and James Gandolfini in The Drop (2014). Other films include Lbs., Amexicano and Hedwig and the Angry Inch. The actor also played Danny Raden - a series lead opposite Larenz Tate in BET's original pilot, Gun Hill. Aronov's other television work includes Count Vincent of Naples in the series Reign, Danny Lambros on The Good Wife, Michael Cahill on Person of Interest, Ricky Vintano on Blue Bloods, billionaire Brice Hunter on Without a Trace and recurring roles on Madam Secretary and The Closer.

For his stage work Aronov received the Tony Award for Best Featured Actor in a Play in 2017 for his role as Uri Savir in the Broadway play Oslo. He was also honored with the Lucille Lortel Award, the Obie Award, and received Drama Desk Award and Outer Critics Circle Award nominations for Oslo. Prior to that the actor originated the role of Paul in Lyle Kessler's First Born at The Actors Studio in New York. He won "The Elliot Norton Award - Best Actor", for originating the lead role in Theresa Rebeck's Mauritius. On Broadway he appeared as Siggie, in the Tony-nominated revival of Golden Boy (2012-2013), directed by Bartlett Sher. He worked with Sher and Lincoln Center for the Performing Arts yet again, playing Gromov, in the American premiere of Blood and Gifts (2011). Aronov was also seen in his solo-show Manigma (2010, 2006), in New York City. In Europe he portrayed Stanley Kowalski in the classic A Streetcar Named Desire (2009). The actor also took on Jean in Miss Julie (2004) at the Cherry Lane Theatre, Dionysus in The Bacchae 2.1 (2001); and Edgar in an award-winning production of King Lear (1999).

Filmography

Television

Film

Awards and nominations

References

External links
 
 
 

Living people
1976 births
American male stage actors
American dramatists and playwrights
Tony Award winners
American male television actors
American male film actors
21st-century American male actors
Jewish American male actors
Uzbekistani Jews

Uzbekistani emigrants to the United States
American people of Uzbekistani-Jewish descent
Male actors from Miami
21st-century Uzbekistani male actors
Southern Methodist University alumni